Kimsey is a surname. Notable people with the surname include:

Chad Kimsey, baseball player
Chris Kimsey (born 1951), English record producer, mixer, and musician
Jim Kimsey, co-founder, CEO, and first chairman of America Online
Rachel Kimsey, actress

See also
 Kinsey (disambiguation)